The Sama Tower (also known as Al Durrah Tower or Al Durrah Tower II) is a skyscraper along Sheikh Zayed Road in Dubai, United Arab Emirates. The tower has 49 floors. Construction began in 2006 and was completed in late 2009.

History 
The building was originally proposed as a supertall building named Al Durrah Tower II. The design was a  twisting tower with more than 75 storeys for residential use, costing about US$140 million. This design was regarded as a major addition to the Dubai skyline, but at the same time, the height of the project was a concern to Dubai's Department of Civil Aviation.

Construction 
Construction of the project began in 2006. The concrete foundation raft for the building was poured about a year later in March 2007 by the Dubai Contracting Company and Ready Mix Beton. Some  of concrete was poured between March 22 and March 23, which set a new construction record for a continuously poured concrete raft. The old pouring record was also held by Ready Mix Beton.

Gallery

See also

List of tallest buildings in Dubai

References

Twisted buildings and structures
Residential skyscrapers in Dubai